Tell Djassa (Tell Jassa, Tell Djassa el-Gharbi) is an archaeological site in Syria, in the Khabur River basin, in the area of the Khabur Triangle in Upper Mesopotamia.

Archaeological research 
The site was excavated in 1988–1990 as part of the Western Hassake Dam Project, an international salvage project organized by the Syrian Directorate-General of Antiquities and Museums. In the framework of the same project, the site of Tell Abu Hafur, located about 2.5 km away, was also studied. The tell was 16 m high and 150 m wide. Four main phases of occupation were distinguished, all dating to the 3rd millennium BC, the Early Dynastic period, especially sub-period III (2500–2300 BC). The site was resettled at the end of the 1st millennium BC, as indicated by fragments of Hellenistic pottery. The research was conducted under the auspices of the Polish Centre of Mediterranean Archaeology University of Warsaw and directed by Maria Krogulska (1988) and Piotr Bieliński (1989–1990). Some of the ceramic vessels from Tell Djassa now form part of the collection of the National Museum in Warsaw. One of the most interesting discoveries was a lead figurine, presumably of the goddess Ishtar.

Further reading 

 Polish National Commission for UNESCO Review. 2017/18 bulletin (Polish Archaeology for the Safeguarding  of World Heritage)
 Bieliński, P. (1991). The third season of excavations in Northeastern Syria – 1990. Polish Archaeology in the Mediterranean, 2.
 Reiche, A. (2001). Polish archaeological research in Northeastern Syria. Bulletin du Musée National de Varsovie, 42

References 
Ancient Mesopotamia
Archaeological sites in al-Hasakah Governorate

External links 

Tell Djassa el-Gharbi
Populated places established in the 3rd millennium BC
1988 archaeological discoveries
Tells (archaeology)
Early Dynastic Period (Mesopotamia)